Springfield Mall is a  regional shopping mall located approximately  southwest of Philadelphia in Springfield Township, Delaware County, Pennsylvania.  It is located just off Interstate 476 (the "Blue Route") along Baltimore Pike, near its busy intersection with Pennsylvania Route 320.  It is serviced by a number of SEPTA bus lines as well as the mass transit system's Route 101 trolley line at the Springfield Mall station, a rarity for suburban Philadelphia shopping malls, many of which are served solely by bus routes.

Springfield Mall is owned jointly by the Simon Property Group and the Pennsylvania Real Estate Investment Trust (each with a 50 percent stake), and is managed by PREIT.

It is currently anchored by a  Macy's and Target, the latter replacing a  Strawbridge's anchor store.

Full service dining options include Carrabba's Italian Grill. Fast food dining options include Sbarro, Auntie Anne's Pretzels, Asian Bistro and Tony Luke's.

History

Springfield Mall opened on September 19, 1974, under the development of Springfield Associates. The original two anchor stores were Bamberger's and John Wanamaker. The Bamberger's was converted to a Macy's in 1986. John Wanamaker closed in 1995 and was reopened as Hecht's the same year. In 1997, the Hecht's was converted to Strawbridge's. In 2005, PREIT and Kravco Simon acquired the Springfield Mall from Springfield Associates LP for $103.5 million. Strawbridge's closed in 2006 following the sale of its parent company to the same parent company as Macy's. The building was sold to Target in 2008 and demolished fall 2008, The new Target was constructed following the Strawbridge's demolition in December 2008 and though 2009 up to the completion in September 2009, The new Target store opened on October 11, 2009, on the same site, coexisting with the nearby Target store opened in 1997 in a former Strawbridge & Clothier, the area's first Target.

1985 shooting spree
On October 30, 1985, Sylvia Seegrist, a 25-year-old paranoid schizophrenic, went on a shooting spree in the mall, killing three and wounding seven others until she was disarmed by other shoppers.

Current anchor stores
Macy's 
Target

Former anchor stores 

Bamberger's (1974-1986, now Macy's)
John Wanamaker (1974-1995, later Hecht's)
Hecht's (1995-1997, later Strawbridge's)
Strawbridge's (1997-2006, demolished in fall 2008/rebuilt as Target in December 2008 until September 2009)

References

External links

Official site

Pennsylvania Real Estate Investment Trust
Simon Property Group
Shopping malls in Pennsylvania
Shopping malls established in 1974
Springfield Township, Delaware County, Pennsylvania